The College of Science (COS) of De La Salle University was originally part of the College of Arts and Sciences. In 1982, the departments of Biology, Chemistry, Mathematics and Physics separated to form the College of Science while the liberal arts departments formed the College of Liberal Arts. Although the College of Science is the youngest and the second smallest college formed in the university, its contribution to the academe and to the country has had tremendous impact to scientific research development and nation-building. And thus in recognition of their efforts, all of the Science and Mathematics programs of the college have been granted the recognition of Center of Excellence in the Philippines by the Commission on Higher Education.

Academic departments of COS

Biology
The Department of Biology focuses itself in laboratory work, lectures, research, and field trips. The Department boasts of its advanced facilities, located in the either St. Joseph Building and in STRC Building. It is a Center for Excellence in Biology by CHED.

Chemistry
The Department of Chemistry has been awarded as a center of excellence by the CHED.  It has since been teaming up with the various departments of the university to provide Engineering and Liberal Arts students with the important facts of Chemistry. The Department also encourages the use of computers in Chemical analyses. The Department has three programs, Bachelor of Science in Chemistry, Bachelor of Science in Chemistry Minor in Business and Bachelor of Science in Biochemistry.

Mathematics
Established in 1946, the Department of Mathematics trains its students in logical thought, critical analysis, imagination, and problem solving. It also handles graduate and undergraduate courses in the College of Business and Economics, Liberal Arts and Education. It was awarded as a center of excellence by the CHED.

Physics
The Department of Physics was recognized by the CHED as a Center of Excellence. The Department caters to a variety of interests in physics: solid-state physics and material science, medical instrumentation, laser physics, instrumentation physics, quantum field theory, and physics education.

Degree offerings

Undergraduate programs
BS in Biochemistry
BS in Biology
BS in Chemistry
BS in Chemistry minor in Business Studies
BS in Chemistry major in Food Science
BS in Human Biology
BS in Mathematics with specialization in Business Applications
BS in Mathematics with specialization in Computer Applications
BS in Statistics major in Actuarial Science
BS in Physics minor in Economics
BS in Physics minor in Finance
BS in Physics with specialization in Materials Science
BS in Physics with specialization in Medical Instrumentation
BS in Premed Physics

Graduate programs
Doctor of Philosophy in Biology
Doctor of Philosophy in Chemistry
Doctor of Philosophy in Mathematics (Regular and Straight Program)
Doctor of Philosophy in Physics (Regular and Straight Program)
Master of Science in Biology
Master of Science in Chemistry
Master of Science in Environmental Science and Ecosystem Management
Master of Science in Mathematics
Master of Science in Physics

Non-thesis master's degree programs
Master in Biology
Master in Chemistry
Master in Mathematics
Master in Physics

College of Science
Science education